Not Fade Away (Remembering Buddy Holly) is a tribute album to Buddy Holly. It was released in February 1996 by MCA Records. The album peaked at number 19 on the Billboard Top Country Albums chart and number 119 on the all-genre Billboard 200.

Track listing

Charts

References

1996 albums
Country albums by American artists
MCA Records albums